Villagrufe is a parish (administrative division)  in Allande, a municipality within the province and autonomous community of Asturias, in northern Spain.

The population is 129 (INE 2011). The postal code is 33889.

Villages and hamlets
 Carballedo 
 Prada
 Pradiella 
 Santullano 
 Tamuño 
 Villagrufe

External links
 Allande 

Parishes in Allande